Vigen Zeinali (born  in Tehran) is a retired Iranian Armenian football player who played for Ararat Tehran and Esteghlal Tehran. He currently living in California

References

Living people
People from Tehran
Ethnic Armenian sportspeople
Iranian footballers
Iranian people of Armenian descent
F.C. Ararat Tehran players
Esteghlal F.C. players
Association footballers not categorized by position
Year of birth missing (living people)